Pristotis is a genus of fish in the family Pomacentridae.

Species
There are two species currently recognized  by FishBase:
Pristotis cyanostigma 
Pristotis obtusirostris

References

Pomacentrinae
Marine fish genera
Taxa named by Eduard Rüppell